Dame Christine McKelvie Cole Catley  (née Bull; 19 December 1922 – 21 August 2011) was a New Zealand journalist, publisher and author.

Career
Christine McKelvie Bull was born in 1922 in Wellington, New Zealand. She grew up on a farm in Hunterville, Rangitikei and began writing while still at school, freelancing for the Taranaki Daily News. She won a scholarship to the University of Canterbury and moved to Christchurch, where she also worked as a part-time reporter for The Press newspaper while studying.

While in Christchurch, she met and became friends with the artist Rita Angus, who painted her and her first child in a portrait entitled Mother and Child in 1945. In 1946, Cole Catley moved to Wellington and began writing for the Labour Party's daily paper, The Southern Cross, the New Zealand Listener, and Radio New Zealand. Australia's ABC Network appointed her their New Zealand correspondent, and in 1956 the network sent her on assignment to Indonesia for two years.

When television came to New Zealand, Cole Catley was the country's first TV reviewer, writing for The Dominion (using the pseudonym "Sam Cree") and for the Sunday Times (under the name "Hillary Court"). She was a member of the Broadcasting Council, but was removed by then Prime Minister Robert Muldoon due to disagreements between them. In 1967, she became tutor-in-charge of New Zealand's first polytechnic school of journalism. In this role, she insisted that half of the students accepted into the school must be female, a move which was considered to greatly accelerate the movement of women into the industry.

Cole Catley's first job in publishing was as an editor for A.H. and A.W. Reed, in Wellington. In 1973, she and her second husband, Doug Catley, set up their own publishing house, Cape Catley Press. The imprint specialised in New Zealand works and authors, and published over 100 titles, including notable writers such as Michael King and Archibald Baxter. Cole Catley also ran writing workshops, which led to a number of writers being published by her publishing company. In 2003, Cole Catley published her own book on the life of New Zealand astronomer Beatrice Tinsley, Bright Star.

She died on 21 August 2011 from lung cancer at age 88.

Other interests
In 1952, Cole Catley and Helen Brew founded Parents Centres New Zealand, an organisation committed to providing education and support for pregnant women and their husbands. The organisation also lobbied authorities to change hospital procedures around childbirth and delivery, such as enabling fathers to be present during labour.

In 1982, Cole Catley's long-time friend, writer Frank Sargeson died and left his estate to her as beneficiary and literary executor. He suggested that she sell his bach and spend the money on a cruise. Instead, she established the Frank Sargeson Trust and the Sargeson Fellowship, and ensured his cottage was retained as a memorial. She was so successful in this endeavour that she was later also involved with establishing the Michael King Writers' Centre.

Honours and awards
In the 1994 New Year Honours, Cole Catley was awarded the Queen's Service Medal for public services. In the 2006 Queen's Birthday Honours, she was appointed a Distinguished Companion of the New Zealand Order of Merit, for services to literature. In 2009, following the reinstatement of titular honours by the New Zealand government, Catley accepted redesignation as a Dame Companion of the New Zealand Order of Merit.

In 2010, Catley received a Copyright Licensing Writers' Award to write her autobiography, which she was working on at the time of her death.

References

Further reading 
 

1922 births
2011 deaths
New Zealand journalists
University of Canterbury alumni
Deaths from cancer in New Zealand
Deaths from lung cancer
New Zealand women journalists
New Zealand women writers
Recipients of the Queen's Service Medal
Dames Companion of the New Zealand Order of Merit
New Zealand publishers (people)
People from Wellington City
New Zealand biographers
Women biographers